Albert Wojciech Adamkiewicz (11 August 1850 – 31 October 1921) was a Polish pathologist born in Żerków.

Biography
Adamkiewicz earned his medical doctorate in 1873 from the University of Breslau where he was a student-assistant to physiologist Rudolf Peter Heinrich Heidenhain. From 1879 until 1892, he was chief of general and experimental pathology at the Jagiellonian University in Cracow.

Adamkiewicz is remembered for his pathological examinations of the central nervous system. His research of the variable vascularity of the spinal cord was an important contribution to the development of modern clinical vascular surgery. He is credited with describing the major anterior segmental medullary artery, which is also known as the Artery of Adamkiewicz.

In the early 1890s, Adamkiewicz published a series of articles claiming the discovery of a cancer-causing parasite he called Coccidium sarcolytus, as well as the existence of an anti-cancer serum. Further testing proved the serum a failure, and Adamkiewicz was severely criticized by the medical community at Jagiellonian University. Soon afterwards, he relocated to Vienna, where he practiced medicine at Rothschild Hospital. 

He is credited for the creation of the Adamkiewicz test, a test for detecting tryptophan, an α-amino acid that is used in the biosynthesis of proteins.

See also
 Pathology
 List of pathologists

References

External links
 
 

1850 births
1921 deaths
People from Jarocin County 
University of Breslau alumni
Academic staff of Jagiellonian University
Polish pathologists